S90 may refer to:

Automobiles 
 Daihatsu Zebra (S90), a pickup truck and van
 Honda Sport 90, a motorcycle
 Toyota Crown (S90), a sedan
 Volvo S90, an executive car

Naval vessels 
 , a submarine of the Royal Navy
 S90-class torpedo boat, of the Imperial German Navy
 , the lead boat of the class

Rail and transit 
 S90 (Long Island bus)
 S90 (New York City bus) serving Staten Island
 S90 (TILO), a railway service in Switzerland

Other uses 
 Canon PowerShot S90 a digital camera
 Series 90 (software platform), for mobile phones
 SIPA S.90, a French trainer aircraft
 Yamaha S90, a synthesizer